Everything Changes is the second studio album by English boy band Take That. It reached number one in the UK Albums Chart, and was nominated for the 1994 Mercury Prize. It was also the third best-selling album of 1993 in the UK.
 
The album was also the band's breakthrough across Europe going top 10 in many countries and top 30 in Australia and Japan.

The album has been certified as 4× Platinum in the UK and stayed in the top 75 of the UK Albums Chart for 78 weeks (a year and six months). The album also holds the UK record for the number of top 10 singles for a group from one album.

The album sold 3 million copies worldwide according to Billboard.

Track listings

Notes
 signifies an additional producer
 signifies an additional vocal producer
 signifies a co-producer

Personnel
 Gary Barlow – vocals, songwriting
 Howard Donald – vocals, songwriting
 Jason Orange – vocals
 Mark Owen – vocals
 Robbie Williams – vocals
 Alan Fisch – engineer
 Pete Craigie – engineer
 Pete Stewart – engineer
 Eliot Kennedy – mixer
 Dean Freeman – photographer
 Eliot Kennedy – producer
 Jonathan Wales – producer
 Mike Ward – producer
 Paul Jervier – producer
 Steve Jervier – producer
 Mark Beswick – additional vocals
 Cary Baylis – guitar

Charts

Weekly charts

Year-end charts

Decade-end charts

Certifications and sales

References

Take That albums
1993 albums